Inveruno (  or Invrugn  is a comune (municipality) in the Metropolitan City of Milan in the Italian region Lombardy, located about  west of Milan. 
 
Inveruno borders the following municipalities: Buscate, Busto Garolfo, Arconate, Casorezzo, Cuggiono, Ossona, Mesero.

References

External links
 Official website

Cities and towns in Lombardy